Snap general elections were held on 9 January 2020 in Sint Maarten, two years earlier than scheduled, following the dissolution of the Second Marlin-Romeo cabinet in September 2019.

Electoral system
The 15 seats in the Estates were elected by proportional representation. In order to participate in the election, new parties and parties without a seat in parliament were required to obtain at least 136 signatures; 1% of the valid votes of the 2018 parliamentary elections.

Results

References

Elections in Sint Maarten
Sint Maarten
2020 in Sint Maarten